Südtiroler Platz-Hauptbahnhof    is a station on  of the Vienna U-Bahn. It is also served by lines S1, S2, S3, S60 and S80 of the Vienna S-Bahn.

It is located in the Favoriten District. It opened in 1978. This station serves Wien Hauptbahnhof, Vienna's main station which partially opened in 2012 and became fully operational in 2016, replacing Wien Südbahnhof.

Art

"SUED" by Franz Graf is found in this station.

References

Buildings and structures in Favoriten
Railway stations opened in 1978
1978 establishments in Austria
Vienna U-Bahn stations
Railway stations in Austria opened in the 20th century